Onehunga Wharf railway station on the Onehunga Branch section of the Onehunga Line was the terminal station for the line to Auckland from 28 November 1878 to 1927. A petition in 1870 objected to the extension from Onehunga, on the grounds that it would take business away from the town.

From 1886 until the completion of the North Island Main Trunk line in 1909, travelling to and from Auckland and the lower North Island involved a train journey north to New Plymouth then by coastal ship from New Plymouth to Onehunga.

The opening and closing dates given by Scoble are: opened June 1874, to passengers April 1892 and closed to goods on 28 December 2006 and on 31 March 1971 to passengers, although the Heritage Trust and another source say that the station closed in 1927. From 10 December 1927 its accounts were merged with Onehunga and it was treated as a flag station for accounting.

By 1899 there was a 4th class station building, urinals,  x  and  x  goods sheds, loading bank, weighbridge, wagon turntable, cattle and sheep yards. From 1976 locomotives were kept at least  from the concrete base of the wharf.

References  

Defunct railway stations in New Zealand
Rail transport in Auckland
Railway stations opened in 1878
Railway stations closed in 1927
History of Auckland